The 2009 Manitoba Lotteries Women's Curling Classic was held October 23-26 at the Fort Rouge Curling Club in Winnipeg, Manitoba. It was the second Grand Slam event of the 2009-2010 women's World Curling Tour.

The event was previously known as the Casinos of Winnipeg Women's Curling Classic. The event featured 32 teams, 30 of which are from Canada and two from Europe. The total purse for the event was $60,000 with $15,000 going to the winning team.

Teams

Results

A Event

B Event

C Event

Playoffs

Sources
WCT Event site

Manitoba Lotteries Women's Curling Classic, 2009
2009 in Manitoba
Curling competitions in Winnipeg